Amgoth Tukaram is an Indian mountaineer. Tukaram is the youngest mountaineer from India who has scaled five of seven toughest and highest peaks in the world. Tukaram is the first youngest person from south India to reach Mount Everest from south cole and also First youngest person From Tribal community.

Early life
Tukaram was born in Takkallapally Thanda in Yacharam Mandal of  Ranga Reddy District, Telangana. Tukaram, youngest among five siblings studied in a Tribal Welfare Residential school in Medak. He once watched an NCC parade at Parade Grounds, Hyderabad and it inspired him to be a cadet. Tukaram was selected from NCC for climbing, and joined The Nehru Institute of Mountaineering (Uttarakhand) in 2014. Tukaram scaled Mt Norbo (17,145 ft) in June 2016 scaled on Telangana Formation Day and hoisted Telangana Flag, In June 2017 he had scaled Mt Rudragaira Peak (19,091 ft), in  July 2017 scaled Mt Stok Kangri (20,187 ft), in July 2018 he scaled the highest mountain peak of Africa Mt Kilimanjaro (19,340 ft) and hoisted the National flag. Tukaram, was congratulated by President of India Ram Nath Kovind and former Governor of Telangana and Andhra Pradesh ESL Narasimhan. Amgoth Tukaram scaled Mount Everest On 22 May 2019, and scaled Mount Elbrus On 27 July 2019.

Mountaineering Achievements
Tukaram was selected from NCC for climbing, and joined The Nehru Institute of Mountaineering (Uttarakhand) in 2014.
 Mt. Norbu in June 2016
 Mt. Rudugaria in June 2017
 Stok Kangri in July 2017
 Mount Everest in 2019
 Mount Kilimanjaro in 2018  
 Mount Elbrus in 2019 
 Mount Aconcagua in 2020 
 Mount Kosciuszko in 2020

Summits with Social Message
 Mount Norbu: Celebrating Telangana State formation
 Mount Rudugaira: Encouraging people to use khadi
 Mount Stokkangri: Displayed a 19-feet Indian flag
 Mount Kilimanjaro: Encouraged use of helmet (Use Helmet- Save Life)
 Mount Elbrus: Message against drugs
 Mount Stok Kangri:  19 Feet Indian Tricolour on the Summit
 Mount Everest: Protect the five elements of nature
 Mount Acongagua: Singing the National Anthem on 26 January
 Mount Kosciuszko: Solidarity to people tackling Australian Bush Fires.

References

1998 births
Indian mountain climbers
Indian summiters of Mount Everest
Living people